"In the Middle" (stylized in caps) is a song recorded by Japanese-American singer-songwriter Ai featuring Daichi Miura. It was released on August 13, 2021, through EMI Records and Universal Music Group.

Background 
In early August 2021, Ai shared an image on social media teasing her next single. A longtime friend with Miura, "In the Middle" will serve as their first collaboration. About the song, Ai commented, "There is no right, left, top, or bottom. I want to always be in the middle with the compassion that many people want to be equal, not which is worse or which is better."

Music video 
A music video directed by Yoshiharu Seri was released on August 13, 2021.

In a behind the scenes video, Ai commented, "This is the first music video that made me cry so much."

Live performances 
Ai and Miura performed the song during CDTV's live summer festival on August 16, 2021.

Charts

References 

Ai (singer) songs
2021 songs
2021 singles
EMI Records singles
Universal Music Group singles
Universal Music Japan singles
Songs written by Ai (singer)
Song recordings produced by Ai (singer)